The genus Myosurus, or mousetail,  belongs to the buttercup family (Ranunculaceae). It comprises about 15 species of annual scapose herbs.  These herbs are nearly cosmopolitan (lacking in eastern Asia and tropical regions), with a center of diversity in western North America. The flowers are easily recognised by bearing 6 stamens with numerous ovaries on a stalk (accounting for the name "mousetail").

Selected species:
Myosurus apetalus - bristly mousetail
Myosurus cupulatus - Arizona mousetail
Myosurus minimus - tiny mousetail
Myosurus nitidus - western mousetail
Myosurus sessilis - vernal pool mousetail

External links
Jepson Manual Treatment
USDA: North American Species

Ranunculaceae
Ranunculaceae genera